71-412 (also 71-411 - for 1000 mm gauge) is a russian four-axle tram car with a variable floor level in the middle part of the cabin.

Model based on Tatra T3SU chassis equipped with a modified car body.

In 2020 4 copies were delivered for operation to Omsk. They are currently in operation.

71-411
71-411 tram of model is a partially low-floor single-section car in 71-412 car form factor designed for a narrow gauge of 1000 mm. It has a narrower body (2.2 m instead of 2.5 m in 71-412).

On January 13 2021, the administration of the Yevpatoria City District (City Council) signed a contract with "JSC Ural Plant of Transport Engineering" for 27 new cars supply to Yevpatoria at the end of 2021.

There are two variants:
 71-411 — basic model, one-sided single-cabin, with three doors on the right side;
 71-411-03 — double-sided double-cab model with front and middle doors on each side, similar to Tatra K5AR trams.

Operation

Gallery

References

Tram vehicles of Russia